Silvio Ramón Martínez Cabrera is a former Major League Baseball pitcher. Martínez pitched all or part of five seasons in the majors, from  until , for the Chicago White Sox and St. Louis Cardinals. He was traded along with Richie Zisk from the Pittsburgh Pirates to the Chicago White Sox for Goose Gossage and Terry Forster at the Winter Meetings on December 10, 1976. Martinez pitched mostly as a starting pitcher but on August 26, 1977, he did pick up his lone major league save. He pitched 2 scoreless innings to nail down a 4-2 White Sox victory over the Brewers.

References

External links

1955 births
Águilas Cibaeñas players
Charleston Charlies players
Charleston Pirates players
Chicago White Sox players
Dominican Republic expatriate baseball players in the United States
Iowa Oaks players

Living people
Major League Baseball pitchers
Major League Baseball players from the Dominican Republic
Niagara Falls Pirates players
Salem Pirates players
Shreveport Captains players
Springfield Redbirds players
St. Louis Cardinals players
St. Petersburg Cardinals players